The Singapore women's national basketball team is the national basketball team of Singapore. It is managed by the Basketball Association of Singapore (BAS), formerly the Singapore Amateur Basketball Association (SABA).

Competitions

SEABA Championship for Women

Current roster
Roster for the 2017 FIBA Women's Asia Cup.

See also
 Singapore national under-19 basketball team
 Singapore national under-17 basketball team
 National Basketball League

References

External links
Official website
FIBA profile

   
Singapore
Basketball
Basketball teams in Singapore
1963 establishments in Singapore